Erna Raid was an annual international military exercise and competition, one of the longest and most difficult in the world, held every August from 1995 to 2011 in Estonia. It was organised by the Erna Society and commemorates the actions of the long-range reconnaissance group 'Erna' in the summer of 1941.

Background

The competition is named after the Erna long-range reconnaissance group and themed after its activities in the summer of 1941. In 1993, a group of enthusiasts followed the historical route of the Erna group of 1941, and came up with the idea of organizing a commemorative competition. A first try with only Estonian participants was held in 1994. In the autumn of 1994, the Erna society was founded, and in 1995, the first annual international competition was held.

Competition
The traditional parts of the competition were:
 landing, in rubber boats, onto a "hostile" shore;
 cross-country tactical movement and navigation, without night campdown, over a distance of around 150 kilometres while avoiding and escaping from "hostile" security forces;
 various (and varying over the years) minigames during the competition. These may involve grenade throwing, combat first aid and other military skills.

Foreign teams were always welcome to partake in the competition. In 2007, 28 teams from nine different countries participated: Estonia (18 teams), Czech Republic (one), Denmark (one), Finland (two), Germany (one), Norway (two), Portugal (one), Sweden (one) and the United States (one), of which Portugal and the Czech Republic are newcomers. Teams from  the United Kingdom have participated in earlier years (most recently, a British Territorial Army team in 2006), but only observed in 2007. A team from Cyprus also observed. Teams from The People's Republic of China have been traditionally successful in the competition and took 1st and 2nd place in 2002. Other successful teams have come from Finland and Norway.

Due to the home advantage attributed to the intimate knowledge of the terrain by the local teams, changes to the competition were discussed in 2011.

In 2013 the competition was renamed the Admiral Pitka Recon Challenge after the Estonian War of Independence hero Johan Pitka, and is now held in different locations throughout Estonia each year.

Past results
The table below records the final results for the year's competition. It does not include retired and disqualified teams. DL is the acronym for the Defence League.

Russian accusations of glorifying Nazism

Since the competition's initiation, sectors of the Russian media claimed the competition's namesake was an attempt to glorify collaboration with Nazi Germany. In 2007, high-ranking government officials sharply criticized the competition, calling it "glamorization of Nazism" and expressing outrage over NATO members participating in the competition. Estonian officials attribute this recent development to the ongoing campaign for the Russian presidential election of 2008. Russian officials claim that commemoration of the Erna group today is part of alleged efforts by the Estonian authorities to glorify the Nazi past (other parts of it being the relocation of a memorial to Red Army invaders and an official greeting from the Minister of Defence to veterans of a unit of Estonians conscripted into a division organized within the Waffen SS to defend Estonia).

An analyst of the US-based think tank Jamestown Foundation believes this view follows Soviet and post-Soviet Russia's official logic on two counts: first, that resistance to the Red Army was inherently illegitimate and conflatable with "fascism" in an occupied country or one targeted for occupation; second, that Estonia should be criticized for remembering an act of national resistance and its casualties.

Estonia's Minister of Defence, Jaak Aaviksoo called the accusations "regrettable" and recalled that the Erna group saved the lives of many civilians from the vengeful Soviet paramilitary units, and specifically pointed out cases of burning farmers alive along with their farms in Kautla.

References

External links
 Erna Society — Official webpage in English
 Erna Raid — The Documentary

Recurring events established in 1995
Military excellence competitions
Military of Estonia
Military skills competitions
Military sport in Estonia
Military education and training in Estonia